Pink Floyd Revisited is a live DVD recorded by rock band Mostly Autumn in 2004. This was a recording of a one-off concert at the Civic Hall in Stratford-Upon-Avon where they played a whole set of Pink Floyd covers. It was only available for a limited period of time and has become quite sought after by Mostly Autumn fans. The V Shows DVD was also included in the same box making it a double DVD set.

Track listing
"Pigs on the Wing - Part 1" (Waters)
"Echoes" (Gilmour/Waters/Wright/Mason)
"Fat Old Sun" (Gilmour)
"Another Brick in the Wall - Part 2" (Waters)
"Sheep" (Waters)
"Julia Dream" (Waters)
"Hey You" (Waters)
"Comfortably Numb" (Gilmour/Waters)
"Run Like Hell" (Gilmour/Waters)
"Pigs on the Wing - Part 2" (Waters)

Personnel
Bryan Josh - Lead/Backing Vocals; Lead/Rhythm/Acoustic Guitars
Heather Findlay - Lead/Backing Vocals; Acoustic Guitars; Tambourine
Iain Jennings - Keyboards
Angela Gordon - Keyboards; Recorders; Backing Vocals
Liam Davison - Lead/Backing Vocals; Lead/Rhythm/Acoustic Guitars; Slide Guitars
Andy Smith - Bass Guitars
Andrew Jennings - Drums

Mostly Autumn live albums
Pink Floyd tribute albums
2004 live albums